Iboloji, (Iboloji layout) is an estate in Rumuigbo, which is in the city of Port Harcourt in Rivers State, Nigeria. Its main entrance is on Ikwerre road opposite MCC & Anglican Church of The Comforter. The Hydropet service station is adjacent to its entrance. The first street in the estate is John Chukwu Crescent, second street is Nwachukwu while the third is Worlu Eguma, etc. Next to Iboloji layout is a large piece of land over which there had been a long dispute between two parties which has been resolved. The main Iboloji road was cemented in the early months of 2005 courtesy of contributions from the landlords and is thus passable by motorists and pedestrians. Most of the adjoining streets in the estate have subsequently been tarred by the government. This has resulted in appreciation of the value of properties. There are a few private schools and hotels as well as other businesses in Iboloji layout.

The land on which Iboloji estate is sited used to belong to a family called Rumuchiworlu and also the name Iboloji is an Ikwerre name.
Chief Egeonu is the head of Rumuchiworlu.

Populated places in Rivers State
Housing estates in Nigeria